The Depot is a musical venue in the Salt Lake City Union Pacific Depot.

The Depot could also refer to:

 Magnolia station, a historic train station in Magnolia, Mississippi
 Station Theatre (Urbana) in Urbana, Illinois
 The Depot at Cleburne Station, a baseball park in Cleburne, Texas
 The Depot, part of Museum Boijmans Van Beuningen in Rotterdam

See also 
 Depot (disambiguation)